Six Flags Darien Lake is a 1,200-acre (4.86 km2) amusement park and resort located in Corfu, New York, off of Interstate 90 between Buffalo and Rochester. Six Flags Darien Lake features a theme park, water park, campground and lodging. It is owned by EPR Properties and operated by Six Flags.

History

Darien Lake Fun Country
In 1954, Darien Lake was excavated and filled. The lake was a popular swimming destination for many years. In 1964, investor Paul Snyder acquired a 164-acre (66.37 ha) parcel of land bordering the lake and opened a small 23-site campground and picnic area. Snyder continued acquiring more land eventually increasing his holdings to almost 1,000 acres (4.05 km2) of land which included seven lakes, the largest of which was Darien Lake. He stocked one of the smaller lakes, Trout Pond, with fish, increased the number of campsites and added activities for resort guests such as a small petting zoo, horseback and pony rides, paddleboats, skateboarding, tennis courts and miniature golf. From the late 70s and into the early 80s, Snyder added more attractions, including a set of water slides on a hill near the park's entrance called Rainbow Mountain, creating an amusement park he named Darien Lake Fun Country. Snyder made a deal with HUSS Park Attractions, turning Darien Lake into the North American showcase for the German manufacturer's new rides. Through this deal, the park acquired rides such as the Pirate, Ranger, Thrillbilly and the Corn Popper, for use in the park and to give HUSS a location to display them to potential US and Canadian buyers. In 1982, the newly merged Arrow Huss built and opened the park's first major roller coaster, Viper.

Funtime Parks
In 1983, Snyder sold a 50% stake in the park to Funtime Inc., which also owned Geauga Lake and Wyandot Lake Park. The Fun Country was dropped from the name, and Funtime brought in some major improvements. Funtime's first purchase was the Vekoma-built Giant Wheel Ferris wheel, the showcase of the 1982 World's Fair in Knoxville, Tennessee and the largest in the United States at the time, which was permanently installed in the park's center. Although no longer the largest in the country, the Giant Wheel is still in operation today (*closing as of 2021 season). Entertainment was also added to the park, with the construction of the Tops Jubilee Theater (now the Grande Theatre), the Lakeside Amphitheater, a large-scale concert stage on the south side of the main lake, presenting big-name acts including The Who, Alice Cooper, and Black Sabbath and Cinema 2000, a wide-angle movie theatre in the back of the park. In the mid-to late 1980s, there was Splashmania, a water skiing show located on Fun Lake. The improvements continued throughout the 1980s and early 1990s, with the addition of a themed kids area, Adventure Land for Kids in 1988 and in 1989 Grizzly Run replaced a kids ride area that was located where a skatepark was. In 1990, six new slides were added to the back of the water slide complex and the area became known as Barracuda Bay and an extra charge was added to the waterpark as well a new locker area, food complex, shopping area and changing rooms. Following the success of a new wooden rollercoaster at Geauga Lake in 1988, Funtime contracted Dinn & Summers to build a new wooden coaster for Darien. The Predator roller coaster opened in May 1990. Around this time, Paul Snyder, sold his remaining share of the park to Funtime, turning over all control to them. In 1992, a new style of entertainment debuted on the midway between Barracuda Bay and the Giant Wheel, a laser light show called Laser Light Fantasy (now called Ignite the Night), which included laser graphics and fireworks. The show was permanently installed in the Lakeside Amphitheater the following year, while concert events were moved to the new Darien Lake Performing Arts Center, which could hold nearly four times as many guests. In 1994, the old Rainbow Mountain waterslides were replaced with a new set called 'Cuda Falls and waterpark became included with park admission.

Premier Parks/Six Flags
In 1995, growing regional park chain Premier Parks bought Funtime, Inc. and its three parks. Premier dove right into changes and additions. In 1995, Skycoaster opened located over Fun Lake. In 1996, Adventure Land was replaced by Popeye's Seaport with all new kiddie rides like a Ferris wheel made to look like barrels, a hand-cranked train ride, a submarine ride, a ship themed play place (removed in 2004), children's shows Popeye's Magic Show and Olive Oyl's Circus that featured audience volunteers, and a food stand and restrooms in the then new kiddie area in an area that was occupied by miniature golf course. A new miniature golf course opened behind the then-new kiddie area near Viper which replaced the old golf course. Also a waterpark expansion with new attractions took place in 1996 and 1997 with Hook's Lagoon (opened in 1996) the Crocodile Isle wave pool (opened in 1997) took over Adventure Land's old location by Elk Lake with new changing rooms and a food stand were built, and a bridge was built to connect the Barracuda Bay slides with the then new water park area and a boat tag game was added to the midway. Three of the old Adventure Land rides were moved to another part of the park as the Tiny Trio in 1997. From 1996-1999, Premier would also install a new roller coaster each year, Nightmare at Phantom Cave in 1996, Mind Eraser in 1997, Boomerang: Coast to Coaster in 1998 and Superman Ride of Steel (the world's first Intamin hypercoaster) in 1999. Nightmare was removed in 1998 and relocated to sister park The Great Escape. In 1998, Premier purchased Six Flags Theme Parks and began to rebrand its own parks as Six Flags. In May 1999, Six Flags Darien Lake opened under its new name, with a few major changes. Premier brought Six Flags' own character base, Looney Tunes and DC Comics, into the parks, renaming Popeye's Seaport to Looney Tunes Seaport, added a show in the vacant former Nightmare at Phantom Cave building called the Batman Thrill Spectacular and Hydro Force, Pipeline Plunge, Riptide Run and Torpedo Rapids were removed from Barracuda Bay and Scrambler replaced Cinema 2000. The midway stage was added to replace the boat tag game and The Emporium gift shop opened in Lasso's old location, Crazy Quilt was removed and replaced with Lasso. Premier Parks formed in 2000, assuming the name "Six Flags Inc." and adding new attractions. The next major attractions installed the Twister in 2000 and Shipwreck Falls in 2002, replacing the old Cascade Canyon water slides on the east side of Barracuda Bay as well as Slingshot behind the 'Cuda Falls water slides; and the Tornado in 2005.

Troubled times
2006 was a year of turmoil for Six Flags and its parks. For the 2006 season, Six Flags moved the Big Kahuna, a family-sized waterslide, from Six Flags AstroWorld to Darien Lake and also moved the Batman The Escape roller coaster from Astroworld into storage at Darien Lake, with possible plans to build it. They also added an opportunity to meet with the entire Justice League at the park. Only a month into the season, however, Six Flags began pulling back the Justice League from Darien Lake and announced Darien Lake, along with eight other parks, was being considered for sale. Many parks throughout the chain, not just those for sale, also experienced numerous changes and cutbacks throughout the summer. In October 2006, after shortened operating hours and seasons, Six Flags officially announced the parks were being offered for sale as a package. Paul Snyder stated in a radio interview he would have considered purchasing Darien Lake from Six Flags if they allowed the parks to be sold individually. In January 2007, Six Flags announced a potential sale of seven of the parks to a new company, PARC 7F (officially called PARC Management). Six Flags chose to retain two parks it had originally considered for sale.

PARC Management/CNL Lifestyle (2007-2010)
In April 2007, Six Flags completed the sale of Darien Lake and six other parks to PARC Management. Upon completion of the sale, PARC entered into a fifty-year contract with CNL Income Properties, under which CNL purchased the properties from and lease them back to PARC for operation. Because of the timing of the final sale with respect to the park's opening, PARC was unable to make any major changes for the 2007 season. The biggest changes for the season were the addition of an all-new show, Le Grande Cirque, which replaced the Batman Thrill Spectacular, and the removal of all Six Flags-, Looney Tunes- and DC Comics-themed signage and references. In 2008, the park debuted the Orange County Choppers MotoCoaster, its first launched rollercoaster. A Zamperla Motocoaster coaster, it was the prototype that had been running outside Zamperla's factory in Italy. PARC pledged to lower admission prices that had risen under Six Flags ownership. Floodgate Falls was closed. In March 2010, Darien Lake expanded its current waterpark to Six Flags Hurricane Harbor (Darien Lake) (featuring several new attractions and a repaint of the 'Cuda Falls waterslide complex in Barracuda Bay), a new  lazy river called Flotation Station, Swirl City slide complex (with four new slides) and a kiddie wave pool called Lazy Days Lagoon. 2010 also brought about some minor park changes such as Viper being repainted with a black track, The Predator getting new trains and the addition of the Critter Chase in Adventure Isle replacing Raft Adventure. CNL subsequently announced that it had reached an agreement to terminate PARC's lease of Darien Lake and up to 17 other locations. The move was made after, according to their 2010 SEC filings, PARC defaulted on their lease obligations.

Herschend Family Entertainment/CNL Lifestyle (2011-2014)
In 2011, Herschend Family Entertainment assumed day-to-day operation and management of Darien Lake and Elitch Gardens. Rowdy's Ridge opened in 2012 with several family rides. For the 2013 season, Blast Off was placed in the newly rethemed Waterfront Boardwalk area, which included major renovations to rides like the Grand Carousel and the Giant Wheel, along with some new dining options. Laserblast received new improvements and was rebranded Ignite the Night. UFO and the 'Cuda Falls waterslides were closed and removed. The Scrambler ride returned after two years in storage.

Premier Parks, LLC (2014-2018)
Herschend Family Entertainment's lease ended after the 2014 season and was taken over by Premier Parks, LLC. New rides installed during this period include Rolling Thunder, a 72-foot Larson 22M Giant Loop; Brain Drain, a set of two body slides that drops riders through a trapdoor at high speeds; and Ripcurl Racer, a six-lane Proslide Kracken Racer. Following the 2016 season, CNL Lifestyle sold Darien Lake and 14 other amusement parks to EPR Properties. The park continued to be leased and operated by Premier Parks, with no immediate change in operations or staffing. Tantrum, a Gerstlauer Euro-Fighter coaster, opened for the 2018 season.

Six Flags/EPR Properties (2018-present)
In May 2018, Six Flags Entertainment Corporation acquired lease rights to operate the park, with the park remaining under the ownership of EPR Properties. Six Flags SkyScreamer, a Funtime Star Flyer, opened for the 2019 season. During this season, the park reverted to the Six Flags Darien Lake branding. For the 2020 season, it was announced that Wahoo Wave, a ProSlide waterslide, would be added to the newly re-named and re-themed Hurricane Harbor WaterPark.

However, the park was temporarily closed due to the COVID-19 pandemic (except for the campgrounds and Darien Square), with no timeframe from the state of New York on when theme parks can open. Despite this, the park announced on September 11th, 2020 the park would remain closed and all season passes and tickets would be carried over to the 2021 season.

Current rides and attractions

Roller coasters

Thrill rides
Many of the rides manufactured by Huss Park Attractions were installed as part of a deal with Huss to use Darien Lake as a North American showcase for Huss's new rides in the early 1980s.

Family rides

Kids rides
Adventure Land for Kids contained all kiddie rides from 1988 through 1996 when it was replaced by Beaver Brothers Bay (previously called Popeye's Seaport, Looney Tunes Seaport and Adventure Isle) with all new rides, exclusively from Zamperla. The Tiny Trio was a set of older kiddie rides from Adventure Land located near Mind Eraser. In 2012, the trio was expanded into Rowdy's Ridge. The Bay is located on an island surrounded by the midway originally formed by Treasure Island Mini-Golf.

Water park rides

Entertainment
All show venues listed here are included with price of admission.

Fright Fest
The original Six Flags Fright Fest was an annual event held at the end of the operating season (Weekends in October, typically) from 1998-2006, which celebrated Halloween. Fright Fest added new areas to the park (Bloodstone Hollow, a free haunted graveyard and town; and Brutal Planet, an upcharge haunted house) and different shows than the regular season (Dead Man's Party in The Grande Theater and Laser Spooktacular at the Lakeside Amphitheatre.) When the park was sold to PARC Management in 2007, the event was rebranded as "Fall Family Fun Fest," adding family oriented areas such as hay mazes and pumpkin painting in addition to the haunted house. During this event, admission to the park was free, with individual charges for each ride and attraction. A re-branded FrightFest returned in 2008 with similar elements to the former Six Flags Fright Fest and additional new elements such as the Fright Night Field Trip, a bus ride through the haunted campgrounds. (However, the event's name had a lack of space between the words "Fright" and "Fest" in order to steer clear of any legal conflict with Six Flags.) The Haunted House and the Trick or Treat Trail also returned from previous years. Fright Fest was removed from Darien Lake in 2015 and replaced by Harvest Fest. The Halloween-themed event returned to Darien Lake in 2018 under the Six Flags branding.

Magic of Lights
In August 2021, the park unveiled a new Christmas Lights display that would be taking place at the park during the upcoming 2021 Holiday season. It ran from November 19th, 2021 through January 2nd, 2022. It’s a 1.25 mile drive-thru holiday light display extravaganza running through the park. This event was free to all current Season Pass Holders and Members. It didn’t return in 2022 based on the website.

Harvest Fest

In 2015, Darien Lake replaced their fall events with a more family-friendly event named Harvest Fest. Although this idea was attempted before with Fall Family Fun Fest, here rides were included with admission and less focus was put on scary attractions. Instead of upcharge haunts, hay rides and crafts for children were included with admission. Food trucks, craft beers and other vendors were made available to offset lower staffing during the offseason. Also, the schedule of the season was shortened to end in September, rather than the end of October. In 2018 and 2019 the season was extended through October, this event took place on weekends in September until Fright Fest started. This event didn’t take place during the 2021 or 2022 seasons.

Former attractions

Past entertainment
Former entertainment venues within the park.

Other on-site entities

Lodge on the Lake Hotel
In 1998, Premier Parks made a major investment to the property with the park's first on-site hotel, designed with a North Woods theme. The $12 million Lodge on the Lake Hotel opened with 161 hotel rooms, two suites and an outdoor heated pool. A few months later, the similarly themed Beaver Brothers Cafe opened as a full-service restaurant offering breakfast, lunch and dinner.

Campgrounds
The campground and picnic area offers campsites, approximately half of which are equipped with park-owned RVs and cabins.

Darien Square
Located within the campgrounds which includes; a General Store, 2 restaurants, a gift shop, arcade and lounge, laundry and the campground Office.

Darien Lake Performing Arts Center
The Darien Lake Performing Arts Center is an outdoor music venue on the park grounds.

Ignite the Night COLORBLAST
Concerts were formerly held at the Laser Stage, also known as the Lakeside Amphitheater. A pool was added in front of the stage as part of the Ignite the Night laser show.

Incidents
 On July 26, 1987, lightning killed three campers sleeping in tents on the campground.
 On May 16, 1999, a 365 lb (165 kg) guest who had been unable to properly secure his lap bar was ejected from Superman – Ride of Steel as the car went over a camel-hump hill. He was awarded US$3.95 million in damages. Seatbelts and an extra brake segment before the final hill were added to the coaster after the incident.
 On September 6, 2009, the body of William Sutherland, a Pennsylvania resident who had been reported missing the day before, was found in a park lake.
 On July 8, 2011, James Hackemer, an Iraq War veteran who had lost both legs in a 2008 roadside bomb attack, fell to his death from the Ride of Steel. The accident was attributed to operator error.

See also

 Incidents at Six Flags parks
 List of contemporary amphitheatres

References

External links

 
 
 Darien Lake Performing Arts Center
 Darien Lake Performing Arts Center

 
Amusement parks in New York (state)
Music venues in New York (state)
Buildings and structures in Genesee County, New York
Tourist attractions in Genesee County, New York
Six Flags amusement parks
Former PARC Management theme parks
Herschend Family Entertainment
Premier Parks, LLC
1954 establishments in New York (state)
Amusement parks opened in 1981
1981 establishments in New York (state)
Funtime, Inc.